Charles W. Thwaites (March 21, 1904 – November 21, 2002) was an American painter. He painted murals for the Section of Painting and Sculpture in Wisconsin in the 1930s, and he later became an oil and watercolor painter in New Mexico.

Life
Thwaites was born on March 21, 1904 in Milwaukee, Wisconsin. He graduated from the University of Wisconsin and the Layton School of Art.

Thwaites began his career as a muralist for the Treasury Department's Section of Painting and Sculpture from 1936 to 1939. He painted murals in post offices like the NRHP-listed Chilton Post Office and Plymouth Post Office. Thwaites became an oil and watercolor painter in New Mexico, where he settled in Taos in the 1940s and relocated to Santa Fe in the 1960s. He was an artist-in-residence at St. John's College in Santa Fe in 1973.

Thwaites had a wife, Antoinette. He died on November 21, 2002 in Santa Fe, New Mexico, where he was buried in the Rosario Cemetery. His work is in the permanent collection of the Smithsonian American Art Museum.

References

External links
 Charles W. Thwaites at The Living New Deal

1904 births
2002 deaths
American muralists
American watercolorists
Artists from Santa Fe, New Mexico
Artists from Milwaukee
Section of Painting and Sculpture artists
Painters from New Mexico
Painters from Wisconsin
University of Wisconsin–Madison alumni
20th-century American painters
21st-century American painters